Patrik Borger (born 19 January 1979) is a German football coach and former player. who works as goalkeeper coach at Holstein Kiel.

Career
Borger was born in Rendsburg. He made his debut on the professional league level in the 2. Bundesliga for FC St. Pauli on 10 August 2007 when he started in a game against 1. FC Köln.

References

External links
 

1979 births
Living people
People from Rendsburg
Footballers from Schleswig-Holstein
German footballers
Association football goalkeepers
2. Bundesliga players
FC St. Pauli players
VfR Neumünster players